The following is a list of Russia women's national rugby union team international matches.

Overall 

Russia's overall international match record against all nations is as follows:

Full internationals

1990s

2000s

2010s

2020s

Other matches

References 

Russia
Rugby union in Russia